Festival de Música Española de Cádiz is an annual music festival in Cádiz, Spain.

References

Music festivals in Spain
Cádiz
Folk festivals in Spain